Johan David Herbst is a former South African rugby union player, who played first class rugby between 2011 and 2016. His regular position is scrum-half or wing.

He retired in 2016 to become a fleet controller at a transport business.

Career

2013 Southern Kings Super Rugby season
He was included in the  squad for the 2013 Super Rugby season.

Pumas

He was a member of the Pumas side that won the Vodacom Cup for the first time in 2015, beating  24–7 in the final. Herbst made seven appearances during the season, scoring one try.

Varsity Cup

References

Living people
1987 births
South African rugby union players
Southern Kings players
Griquas (rugby union) players
SWD Eagles players
Rugby union scrum-halves
People from Stellenbosch
Stellenbosch University alumni
Rugby union players from the Western Cape